Plecoptera is a genus of moths of the family Erebidae. It was described by Achille Guenée in 1852.

Description
Palpi slight and reaching vertex of head, where the third joint minute. Antennae of male with long cilia and bristles. Thorax and abdomen smoothly scaled. Tibia slightly hairy and spineless. Forewings with nearly rectangular apex.

Species
 Plecoptera albipuncta Viette, 1970
 Plecoptera androconiata Hampson, 1926
 Plecoptera annexa (Distant, 1898)
 Plecoptera approximans Hampson, 1926
 Plecoptera arctinotata (Walker, 1865)
 Plecoptera aspila (Hampson, 1910)
 Plecoptera butkevicii Hacker & Saldaitis, 2010
 Plecoptera chalciope (Strand, 1918)
 Plecoptera costisignata Hampson, 1926
 Plecoptera delos (Viette, 1972)
 Plecoptera dentilinea Hampson, 1926
 Plecoptera dimorpha Gaede, 1939
 Plecoptera diplogramma Hampson, 1926
 Plecoptera diplosticha Hampson, 1926
 Plecoptera divergens Strand, 1915
 Plecoptera flaviceps (Hampson, 1902)
 Plecoptera flavilinea Hampson, 1910
 Plecoptera fletcherana Viette, 1966
 Plecoptera geminilinea Hampson, 1926
 Plecoptera grisea Hampson, 1910
 Plecoptera hypoxantha Hampson, 1926
 Plecoptera infuscata Hampson, 1910
 Plecoptera inquinata Lederer, 1857
 Plecoptera lacinia (Saalmüller, 1880)
 Plecoptera laniata Hampson, 1910
 Plecoptera leucosticha Hampson, 1926
 Plecoptera mainty Viette, 1972
 Plecoptera major (Holland, 1894)
 Plecoptera megarthra Hampson, 1910
 Plecoptera melalepis Hampson, 1910
 Plecoptera melanoscia Hampson, 1926
 Plecoptera mesostriga Hampson, 1926
 Plecoptera misera (Butler, 1883)
 Plecoptera mollardi D. S. Fletcher & Viette, 1955
 Plecoptera nebulilinea Walker, 1863
 Plecoptera nigrilunata Gaede, 1939
 Plecoptera nimba D. S. Fletcher & Viette, 1955
 Plecoptera oculata (Moore, 1882) (from India)
 Plecoptera ovaliplaga (Warren, 1914)
 Plecoptera poderis (Wallengren, 1863)
 Plecoptera polymorpha Hampson, 1916
 Plecoptera punctilineata Hampson, 1910
 Plecoptera quaesita Swinhoe, 1885
 Plecoptera quadrilineata (Moore 1882) (from India)
 Plecoptera recens Saalmüller, 1891
 Plecoptera recta Pagenstecher, 1886
 Plecoptera reflexa Guenée, 1852
 Plecoptera resistens (Walker, 1858)
 Plecoptera reussi Bryk, 1915
 Plecoptera reversa (Walker, 1865)
 Plecoptera rufirena (Hampson, 1902)
 Plecoptera sakalava (Viette, 1976)
 Plecoptera sarcistis Hampson, 1910
 Plecoptera stuhlmanni (Pagenstecher, 1893)
 Plecoptera thermozona Hampson, 1910
 Plecoptera trichophora Hampson, 1910
 Plecoptera tripalis (Wallengren, 1863)
 Plecoptera uniformis (Moore, 1882) (from India)
 Plecoptera violacea (Pagenstecher, 1884)
 Plecoptera zonaria (Distant, 1898)

References

 

Calpinae
Anobinae